USS Antietam (CG-54) is a  guided missile cruiser of the United States Navy. Antietam was named for the site of the 1862 Battle of Antietam, Maryland, between Confederate forces under General Robert E. Lee and Union forces under Major General George McClellan, during the American Civil War. Antietam earned the 2007 and 2008 Battle Efficiency awards, also known as the "Navy E" or "Battle E" award, for the John C. Stennis Strike Group.

Construction
Antietam was laid down by the Litton-Ingalls Shipbuilding Corporation at Pascagoula, Mississippi, on 15 November 1984, launched on 14 February 1986, and commissioned on 6 June 1987 in Baltimore, Maryland.

Public relations
From 1988 to 1991, the ship was assigned to Naval Surface Group, Long Beach, which was part of Commander, Naval Surface Forces Pacific, and available for tours.

The ship was featured in Visiting... with Huell Howser Episode 327, filmed in 1995.

Capability
The ship is armed with guided missiles and rapid-fire guns. She also carries two Sikorsky SH-60 Seahawk LAMPS helicopters, capable of multiple missions, but primarily equipped for antisubmarine warfare (ASW).

Ship history
Antietam was one of the first vessels to take part in Operation Desert Shield, along with the rest of the  Battlegroup in August 1990, in response to the Invasion of Kuwait. Antietam then returned to the United States on 20 December 1990. According to an interview in 2007 BBC documentary, The Last Flight to Kuwait, Lawrence Eddingfield, who was Captain at that time states that the vessel was involved in a helicopter rescue of 2 British SAS troops who had arrived on BA 149 during the Invasion.

In March 2003, Antietam was assigned to Carrier Group Three.

Antietam operated out of her home port of San Diego, California. In 2009, she completed a six-month deployment, leaving San Diego in January 2009, and returning home in July 2009. Stops along the way included Hong Kong, Japan, South Korea, Singapore, Thailand, Guam, and Hawaii.

From January to August 2007, Antietam deployed to the Persian Gulf. During that seven-month deployment, she visited Dubai, Singapore, Hong Kong, and Pearl Harbor before returning to home port.

From February to August 2005, Antietam completed a circumnavigation of the Earth, leaving San Diego to the west and returning home by way of the east. During the deployment, she had an extended stay in the Persian Gulf as part of Operation Iraqi Freedom. On the return to home port, she disembarked nearly a third of her active personnel in Florida to make room for family and friends of the remaining crew, who embarked in Puerto Vallarta, Mexico, to take part in a friends and family "tiger cruise" back to San Diego.

In February 2013, Antietam relieved  in a "hull-swap" at Yokosuka, Japan, in which the two crews swapped ships. Cowpens, previously deployed to Yokosuka, was then homeported at Naval Base San Diego, California, while Antietam took up her new homeport at Yokosuka.
On 31 January 2017, Antietam ran aground in Tokyo Bay near her home port of Yokosuka, Japan. Antietam was anchored off the coast in 30-knot winds and a strong tide when the crew noticed the ship was dragging her anchor. They got the ship underway, but shortly after doing so, they felt the ship shudder as she lost all pitch control in both propellers. They had run aground on a shoal with damage to both propellers and one of the propeller hubs, causing  of hydraulic oil to leak into the water. No personnel were injured during the incident. Repairs were expected to cost at least $4.2 million.

On 24–25 July 2019, she again transited the Taiwan Strait. On 19–20 September 2019 she transited the Taiwan Strait a third time. During at least one of these transits, a Chinese WZ-7 HALE drone as well as Shenyang J-11 strike fighters followed her and warned one of their helicopters that it was flying too close to the mainland.

In December 2020 the U.S. Navy's Report to Congress on the Annual Long-Range Plan for Construction of Naval Vessels stated that the ship was planned to be placed Out of Commission in Reserve in 2024.

In May 2022, Antietam was homeported at Yokosuka, Japan.

On 28 August 2022, Antietam along with sister ship  conducted a routine transit through the Taiwan Strait. This was the first such transit to occur since the 2022 visit by Nancy Pelosi to Taiwan.

Awards
 Navy Unit Commendation - (Aug-Nov 1990)
 Navy Meritorious Unit Commendation - (Dec 1998-May 1999, Feb-Sep 2003, Apr-Jun 2005, Apr 2012-Dec 2013)
 Battle "E" - (1989, 1990, 1994, 1995, 2000, 2003, 2007, 2008, 2012, 2014, 2015)
 Southwest Asia Service Medal - (Aug-Nov 1990)
 Spokane Trophy Award – (1990)
 Captain Edward F. Ney Memorial Award - (1993)
 LAMPS MK III Safety Award - (1989)
 Chief of Naval Operation's Safety Award - (1997)

References

External links 

 
 united-states-navy.com: USS Antietam
 USS Antietam escorting USS Kitty Hawk in 1997
 

 

Ticonderoga-class cruisers
Ships built in Pascagoula, Mississippi
1986 ships
Cold War cruisers of the United States
Cruisers of the United States
Maritime incidents in 2017